Collin Morikawa (born February 6, 1997) is an American professional golfer who plays on the PGA Tour and European Tour. He began his PGA Tour career with 22 consecutive made cuts, second only to Tiger Woods' 25-cut streak. Morikawa has five PGA Tour wins – including two major championships, the 2020 PGA Championship and the 2021 Open Championship, winning both on his debut. In May 2018, Morikawa spent three weeks as the top-ranked golfer in the World Amateur Golf Ranking. He also became the first American to win the Race to Dubai on the European Tour.

Amateur career
Morikawa played collegiate golf at the University of California, Berkeley, from 2015 to 2019, winning five times, including the 2019 Pac-12 Conference Championship. Aside from his collegiate wins, he won the Western Junior, Trans-Mississippi Amateur, Sunnehanna Amateur and the Northeast Amateur. He played on the winning Arnold Palmer Cup team in 2017 and 2018, the winning Walker Cup team in 2017 and the Eisenhower Trophy team in 2018 that finished second by one stroke. In May 2018, he spent three weeks as the top-ranked golfer in the World Amateur Golf Ranking.

Professional career

2019
Morikawa made his debut as a professional at the 2019 RBC Canadian Open, where he tied for 14th place. On July 7, Morikawa tied for second at the 3M Open. On July 14, he tied for 4th at John Deere Classic. With that finish, Morikawa secured PGA Tour membership for the 2019–20 season. Morikawa then won his first PGA Tour event two weeks later, at the Barracuda Championship – beating Troy Merritt by three points.

2020
On June 14, Morikawa tied for the lead of the 2020 Charles Schwab Challenge after 72 holes. This was the first PGA Tour tournament played after a three-month hiatus due to the COVID-19 pandemic. Morikawa missed a short par putt on the first playoff hole to lose to Daniel Berger.

On June 26, Morikawa missed his first cut on the PGA Tour at the Travelers Championship, ending a streak of 22 consecutive made cuts, the second-longest streak to start a professional career to the 25 made by Tiger Woods.

On July 12, Morikawa beat Justin Thomas in a playoff to win his second PGA Tour title at the Workday Charity Open. The win was the first non-alternate PGA Tour victory for him. Morikawa rallied from a three-shot deficit with three holes remaining, and made a 25-foot birdie putt on the first playoff hole to stay alive, before winning with a par on the third playoff hole.

On August 9, Morikawa won the 2020 PGA Championship to win a major in only his second major championship start. His final round of 64 tied the lowest final round score shot by a PGA Champion, matching Steve Elkington in the 1995 PGA Championship. With his win, Morikawa was the third youngest golfer to win the PGA Championship when he won the event at age 23. Morikawa was also the fourth golfer to win the PGA Championship before turning 24 years old.

2021
On February 28, Morikawa won the 2021 WGC-Workday Championship at the Concession Golf Club in Bradenton, Florida. Morikawa won by three strokes over Billy Horschel, Viktor Hovland and Brooks Koepka.

On July 18, Morikawa won the 2021 Open Championship at Royal St George's Golf Club in Kent, England. Morikawa won by two strokes over Jordan Spieth. He became the first player since Bobby Jones in 1926 to win two majors in eight or fewer starts. He also became the first player to win two different majors in his debut appearance.

In August, Morikawa finished in a tie for 3rd place at the Olympic Games. He lost in a 7-man playoff for the bronze medal.

In September, Morikawa played on the U.S. team in the 2021 Ryder Cup at Whistling Straits in Kohler, Wisconsin. The U.S. team won 19–9 and Morikawa went 3–0–1 including a tie in his Sunday singles match against Viktor Hovland.

In November, he won the European Tour's season ending DP World Tour Championship, Dubai. He also became the first American to win the Race to Dubai.

2022
In February, Morikawa shot a final-round 65 at the Genesis Invitational to finish tied-second; two shots behind Joaquín Niemann.

2023 
At the Sentry Tournament of Champions in January, Morikawa held a six shot lead after 54 holes. He went the first 67 holes of the tournament without a bogey, but then made three consecutively and ultimately finished second; two strokes behind Jon Rahm. This tied Morikawa for the PGA Tour record for largest 54-hole lead squandered.

Personal life
The son of Debbie and Blaine Morikawa, Morikawa was born in Los Angeles, California, and is of Chinese-Japanese descent. He graduated from La Cañada High School in La Cañada Flintridge, California, in Los Angeles County. Morikawa graduated from the University of California, Berkeley in 2019 with a degree in business administration.

In December 2021, Morikawa got engaged to his long-time girlfriend, Katherine Zhu. They were married on November 26, 2022.

Amateur wins
2013 Western Junior
2015 Trans-Mississippi Amateur
2016 Silicon Valley Amateur, Sunnehanna Amateur
2017 ASU Thunderbird Invitational, Northeast Amateur
2018 Wyoming Desert Intercollegiate, Querencia Cabo Collegiate, Annual Western Intercollegiate
2019 The Farms Invitational, Pac-12 Championship

Source:

Professional wins (6)

PGA Tour wins (5)

PGA Tour playoff record (1–2)

European Tour wins (4)

The DP World Tour Championship, Dubai is also a Rolex Series tournament.

Playoff record

Web.com Tour playoff record (0–1)

Major championships

Wins (2)

Results timeline
Results not in chronological order in 2020.

CUT = missed the half-way cut
"T" = tied
NT = No tournament due to COVID-19 pandemic

Summary

Most consecutive cuts made – 8 (2020 Masters – 2022 U.S. Open)
Longest streak of top-10s – 4 (2021 PGA – 2022 Masters)

Results in The Players Championship

CUT = missed the halfway cut
"T" indicates a tie for a place

World Golf Championships

Wins (1)

Results timeline

1Cancelled due to COVID-19 pandemic

QF, R16, R32, R64 = Round in which player lost in match play
NT = No tournament
"T" = Tied
Note that the Championship and Invitational were discontinued from 2022.

U.S. national team appearances
Amateur
Arnold Palmer Cup: 2017 (winners), 2018 (winners)
Walker Cup: 2017 (winners)
Eisenhower Trophy: 2018

Professional
Ryder Cup: 2021 (winners)
Presidents Cup: 2022 (winners)

Notes

References

External links

American male golfers
PGA Tour golfers
Winners of men's major golf championships
Olympic golfers of the United States
Golfers at the 2020 Summer Olympics
California Golden Bears men's golfers
Golfers from California
American sportspeople of Japanese descent
American sportspeople of Chinese descent
Sportspeople from Los Angeles County, California
People from La Cañada Flintridge, California
1997 births
Living people